Pirakuh may refer to:
 Pirakuh Rural District (پيراكوه - Pīrākūh)
 Pirakuh, Gilan (پيركوه - Pīrakūh)